Carine M. Feyten is the second chancellor and eleventh president of Texas Woman's University (TWU), which is part of the Texas Woman's University System, established in 2021. The public university system has campuses in  Denton, Dallas and Houston. Feyten was selected by the TWU Board of Regents in March 2014 and began her tenure in July of that year. She is the fifth woman to hold the title of president and second to hold the title of chancellor following a series of six male presidents, starting with Cree T. Work in 1901 and ending with John A. Guinn in 1976. In accordance with the servant leadership framework, she leads a university that enrolls about 16,000 students, predominantly women; employs more than 2,800 faculty and staff; runs on an annual operating budget that exceeds $256 million; and provides an annual statewide economic impact of more than $1.8 billion.

Career 
Prior to moving to the United States, Feyten earned a BA in Germanic Philology and MA in English, Dutch, and Education, both from University of Louvain (UCLouvain). She went on to earn a PhD in Second Language Acquisition from the University of South Florida. She stayed on as faculty at USF, and concluded her 23-year tenure there in 2006. Prior to taking her current role at TWU, she served as the dean of the College of Education, Health, and Society at Miami (OH) University. She has co-authored more than 100 journal article, conference papers, and book chapters. She says, "I've always been fascinated with language—communication across linguistic, ethnic, and cultural boundaries." She speaks five living languages (Flemish/Dutch, French, German, English, and Spanish) and two dead languages (Latin and classical Greek).

Personal life 

Carine M. Feyten grew up in a Flemish town in Belgium speaking both French and Flemish. She later attended an all-girls boarding school near Tournai, Belgium. She is the oldest and tallest member of her family. She has a son and lives with her husband Chad Wick in the University House on the Texas Woman's Denton campus.

References 

Living people
Year of birth missing (living people)
Place of birth missing (living people)
Texas Woman's University
Heads of universities and colleges in the United States
Université catholique de Louvain alumni